Shiv Shani Mandir, Dhori is a temple located in Bokaro District of Jharkhand. It is about 32 km from Bokaro and is located at the old B.D.O Office of Dhori, Phusro. The presiding deity of the temple, Sri Shiv, as well as Parvati, Ganesh, Hanuman, Kartikey and Shaneshwara or Lord Shani (the personification of the planet Saturn) are worshiped with utmost reverence and devotion by multitudes of people from all over the locality. Unlike other pilgrimage centers, devotees here can perform puja, abhishek, or other religious rituals themselves.
One of the unique aspects of the temple is that it is the only temple in the Bermo area where Lord Shiva and Lord Shani are established together.
The people here believe that it is the benediction of the god that the locality is quite peaceful.
The Shri Maa Banaso Temple and the Surya Temple of Badhkaro are the nearby attractions. 

By road, the temple is linked with Bokaro (32 km) and Phusro (01 km).  
Phusro Railway Station and Amlo halt are the nearest railroads.

History
"Shiv-Shani Mandir" was established in 1975, due to a heavy effort of local rich men (seths). Awadhesh Pathak was chosen as the first pujari of this temple. He devoted his whole life to worshiping Lord Shiva (Shiv-ling) of the temple. The temple was dedicated to the worship of Shiv-ling (Shiv), Ganesh, Parvati, and Hanuman. A few years ago Arvind Pathak (son of Awadhesh Pathak) started worshiping Lord Shiva and took the official duty of the second pujari of the temple. , Amit Pathak is the priest of the temple. Since there was no temple for Lord Shanidev, Dr. Sudhir Gupta established Lord Shani in the same temple in 2010. This changed the name of this temple from Shiv Mandir to Shiv Shani Mandir. Since 2010, it is the only temple where Lord Shiva is with his disciple Shani Dev.

Maintenance and management
The temple is run by a committee of six to seven men considered the "pillars" of this temple. Since the beginning of 2018, the committee consists of:
President - Shri Kant Mishra
Cashier - Suraj Kumar Vishwakarma
Secretary - Sankar
Pujari & Manager - Amit Pathak
Assistant Managers - Sumit Pathak and Nav Yuvak Shangh

External links
Facebook Page
Blog

Bokaro district
Hindu temples in Jharkhand